Þormóður Árni Jónsson (often transliterated as Thormodur Arni Jonsson, born 2 March 1983 in Reykjavík) is an Icelandic judoka. He competed at the 2008 Summer Olympics in the +100kg category and lost in the round of 16 to Mohammad Reza Roudaki. Four years later in the 2012 Summer Olympics he again took part in the +100 kg tournament but lost in his first match to Rafael Silva.

He once again competed for Iceland at the 2016 Summer Olympics in Rio de Janeiro. He was defeated by Maciej Sarnacki of Poland in the round of 32. He was the flagbearer for Iceland during the Parade of Nations.

References

External links
 

1983 births
Living people
Thormodur Arni Jonsson
Thormodur Arni Jonsson
Judoka at the 2008 Summer Olympics
Judoka at the 2012 Summer Olympics
Judoka at the 2016 Summer Olympics
Thormodur Arni Jonsson